The California Strawberry Commission, is a state-chartered agency of the California Department of Food and Agriculture.  Established by the California State Legislature in 1993, the commission replaced the California Strawberry Advisory Board.  The commission represents nearly 600 strawberry shippers, processors and growers within the state of California.
The commission is not funded by tax payers but by self-taxation or assessments on California strawberry growers.  The amount assessed is approved annually by the commission board of directors.  This assessment pays for the commission’s activities and projects.

The current president is Rick Tomlinson. He replaces Mark Murai, a third generation strawberry farmer from Orange County, California.

Activities and projects 

The California Strawberry Commission focuses activities and projects in:

 Public Policy
 Trade Relations
 Marketing Communications
 Production and Nutrition Research
 Grower Education and Outreach

Activities and projects are developed, approved and implemented under the authority of the commission’s board of directors.

The CSC's predecessor organization, the Board, popularized the use of soil fumigation starting in 1967 and it has remained vital ever since.

Goals 

The California Strawberry Commission’s stated vision is to be “the unified voice for a healthy California strawberry industry.”  Their mission is “to shape a favorable environment that allows stakeholders in the California strawberry industry the opportunity to succeed.”

See also

U.S. Department of Agriculture
California Environmental Protection Agency
Production of strawberries in California

References

External links

California Department of Food and Agriculture

1993 establishments in California
Strawberry Commission
Government agencies established in 1993
Strawberry Commission
Watsonville, California
Strawberries